Mason County Airport  is a county-owned, public-use airport in Mason County, Texas, United States. It is  located three nautical miles (6 km) southeast of the central business district of Mason, Texas.

Facilities and aircraft 
Mason County Airport covers an area of 232 acres (94 ha) at an elevation of 1,502 feet (458 m) above mean sea level. It has two runways: 17/35 is 3,716 by 50 feet (1,133 x 15 m) with an asphalt surface and 13/31 is 3,000 by 60 feet (914 x 18 m) with a turf surface.

For the 12-month period ending January 21, 2012, the airport had 1,800 general aviation aircraft operations, an average of 150 per month. At that time there were six single-engine aircraft based at this airport.

References

External links 
 Mason County Airport (T92) at Texas DOT Airport Directory
 Aerial image as of January 1995 from USGS The National Map
 
 

Airports in Texas
Transportation in Mason County, Texas